Álvaro Bardón Muñoz (1940–2009) was a Chilean politician and economist who served as President of the Central Bank of Chile.

Economists like Pablo Baraona has referred to him as an original libertarian, opinion that happened to title a book about Bardón.

References

External links
 Blog about him

1940 births
2009 deaths
Chilean people
Christian Democratic Party (Chile) politicians
University of Chile alumni
University of Chicago alumni
Chilean libertarians
Chilean anti-communists